A dearomatization reaction is an organic reaction which involves arenes as reactants and in which the reaction products have permanently lost their aromaticity. This reaction type is of some importance in synthetic organic chemistry for the organic synthesis of new building blocks  and in total synthesis.  Several methods for the dearomatization of carbocyclic arenes exist: hydrogenation (Birch reduction), alkylative dearomatization, photochemical dearomatization, thermal dearomatization, oxidative dearomatization, dearomatization with transition metals and enzymatic dearomatization.

Photochemical dearomatization
Examples of photochemical reactions are those between certain arenes and alkenes forming [2+2] and [2+4] cycloaddition adducts.

Enzymatic dearomatization

Examples of enzymes capable of arene dearomatization  are toluene dixoyhydrogenase, naphthalene dixoyhydrogenase and benzoyl CoA reductase.

Transition-metal assisted dearomatization
A classic example of transition-metal assisted dearomatization is the Buchner ring expansion Catalytic asymmetric dearomatization reactions (CADA) are used in enantioselective synthesis.

References

Organic reactions